Iraj Ghaderi (‎; 17 April 1934 – 6 May 2012) was an Iranian film director and actor. He briefly studied to become a pharmacist, but soon dropped out. He died in Tehran on 6 May 2012, aged 77.

Life
Iraj Ghaderi studied in pharmacology but did not finish the program. His artistic career began in 1956 with playing in the film Intersection Accidents by Samuel Khachikian. He established the film company Panorama with Moosa Afshar in 1963. He, who is often recognized as one of the major filmmakers of the pre-revolutionary Iranian cinema, continued filmmaking after the revolution with the film Taraj in 1985.

Death
In May 2012, Iraj Ghaderi was admitted to Mehrdad hospital with a deterioration in health due to lung cancer. Shortly after, he died on 6 May. He was laid to rest in Karaj's Behesht-e Sakineh cemetery.

Filmography

Actor 
Shabake (2012)
Pato zamin Nazar (2009)
The Trial (2007)
Aquarium (2005)
Fame (2000)
Dada (1982)
The Imperilled (1982)
Baradarkoshi (1980)
Panjomin Savar-e Sarnevesht (1980)
Hokm-e Tir (1979)
Kooseye Jonoob (1978)
Aci Hatiralar (1977)
Back and Dagger (1977)
Do Kalle Shagh (1977)
Sine-chak (1977)
Awake in the City (1976)
Rafigh (1976)
The Chandelier (1976)
Death in the Rain (1975)
Shahrag (1975)
The Desire (1975)
The Target (1975)
Ghafas (1974)
Mu-Sorkhe (1974)
The Doctor and the Dancer (1974)
Torkaman (1974)
Bi-Gharar (1973)
Unveiled (1973)
Atal Matal Tootool-e (1972)
Thirst (1972)
Tobeh (1972)
For Whom the Hearts Beat (1971)
Gholam Zhandarm (1971)
Jan-Sakht (1971)
Noghre Dagh (1971)
Restless Hearts (1971)
Kooche-Mardha (1970)
Wrath of Eagles (1970)
Azhire Khatar (1970)
Oath of Silence (1969)
Dashte Sorkh (1968)
Separate Beds (1968)
Shahrahe Zendegi (1968)
Leilaj (1966)
The Cry of the Village (1965)
Branded (1965)
Gate of Fate (1965)
Dead End (1965)
The Girls Mischief (1964)
The Cobweb (1963)
Incorrigible (1962)
A Flower in the Salt Land (1961)
The Forest Incident (1961)
The Spring of Life (1960)

Director 
 Network (2010)
 Pato zamin nazar (2009)
 The Trial (2007) 
 Aqvariom (2005)
 Cheshman siah (2003)
 Sam o Nargess (2000)
 Fame (2000)
 Tootia (1998)
 Claws in the Dust  (1997)
 Nabakhshoodeh (1996)
 Mikhaham zende bemanam (1995)
 I Want to Live (1994)
 Taraj (1985)
 The imperilled  (1982)
  Dada (1982)
  Baradarkoshi (1980 )
 Hokm-e tir (1979)
 Do kalle-shagh (1977)
 Back and Dagger (1977)
 Sine-chak (1977)
 Awake in the city (1976)   
 Bot  (1976) 
 Rafigh  (1976) 
 The Target (1975) 
 The Desire  (1975) 
 The Cage (1974) 
  Bi-gharar (1973) 
  Unveiled  (1973) 
 Thirst  (1972) 
 Noghreh-dagh (1971) 
 Sekke-ye shans  (1970) 
 Basatrhaye jodagane (1968) 
 Shahrahe zendegi (1968)

References

External links
 
 ایرج قادری درگذشت

1934 births
Iranian male film actors
Iranian film directors
2012 deaths
Deaths from lung cancer in Iran
Iranian screenwriters
Iranian film producers